The Larrousse LH94 was the Formula One car built and raced by the Larrousse team for the 1994 Formula One season. The LH94 was also the final car to be built and raced by Larrousse, as the team did not survive into  owing to financial problems.

Concept
The LH94 was designed by Larrousse UK, a fifteen-strong component of the team based in Bicester, England and owned by Robin Herd. It was based around the monocoque of the previous year's LH93 chassis. The front suspension of the LH94 remained unchanged from the previous year, although the team changed its damper supplier from Bilstein to Penske. The car was also more structurally rigid than the LH93.

The main differences between the LH94 and its predecessor were that the LH94 had a smaller fuel tank to take advantage of the reintroduction of refuelling in pitstops in 1994 and a different engine. In  Larrousse had used Chrysler-funded Lamborghini V12s but the programme was halted for 1994. The team decided to return to Ford power, using the Series 7 version of Cosworth HB engine which had powered the Benetton and McLaren teams the previous year.

Larrousse also made a deal with Benetton to use the team's 1993 gearbox in the LH94 chassis. Larrousse's association with Benetton was to prove controversial, however, as the former became involved in the aftermath of the latter's pit fire at the 1994 German Grand Prix, wherein Benetton's excuse for removing a filter in the fuel hose was attributed to communication between Larrousse and the fuel-equipment manufacturer, Intertechnique, which apparently authorised Larrousse to remove the filters in its own fuel hoses.

Construction
Four LH94 chassis were constructed at Larrousse UK. The first three were ready for the beginning of the season, whilst chassis LH94/4 came into service at the French Grand Prix, replacing LH94/3. The car's livery was influenced by its new sponsor: after several years of being funded by the French government, Larrousse secured sponsorship from the Belgian Alken-Maes brewery. The LH94 therefore usually ran in a green Tourtel livery, although on occasion this was replaced by a red-and-white colour scheme to display its sister brand, Kronenbourg. Zanussi, Rizla, and SEITA (Gitanes/Gauloises; shown only in races where tobacco advertising is permitted) joined Alken-Maes as the team's major secondary sponsors.

Development
Despite a limited budget, Larrousse had a testing schedule planned for the 1994 season. However, following the deaths of Ayrton Senna and Roland Ratzenberger at the San Marino Grand Prix, the technical regulations were changed for subsequent races to slow the cars down by making the chassis produce less downforce and the engines less power. This resulted in new components having to be built for the LH94 and a new supply of spare parts to be confirmed for the rest of the season, which eliminated the financial support for any further development.

Racing history
Larrousse began the year with drivers Érik Comas, who had raced for the team the previous year, and Olivier Beretta, an F1 rookie who paid for his seat after experience in Formula 3000. The year began promisingly, with Comas taking 13th place on the grid at the Brazilian Grand Prix and scoring a point in the next race at Aida. However, the regulation changes following the San Marino Grand Prix resulted in development work on the car ceasing, which coincided with a run of engine failures for both cars from the Spanish Grand Prix through the middle of the season. Despite the efficient gearchanges provided by the Benetton transmission, which in Comas' words made it "fun to drive the car", the LH94 suffered from abiding understeer and poor traction. As the team's rivals made progress throughout the year, Larrousse gradually sank towards the back of the grid. Comas did, however, manage to score another point at the attritional German Grand Prix.

Larrousse's parlous financial situation was exposed towards the end of the year, when Beretta was dropped after his financial support dried up and the team was forced to resort to pay drivers in a last-ditch attempt to survive. His seat was henceforth shared between former Larrousse drivers Philippe Alliot and Yannick Dalmas, in addition to rookie Hideki Noda. At the season-closing Australian Grand Prix, which would prove to be the team's last F1 race, team leader Comas was also replaced by Jean-Denis Délétraz.

Larrousse attempted to enter the  season but had not had enough funds over the winter to build the LH95, which had been designed by Herd. The team then merged with the abortive Junior F1 Team before the start of the season, enabling it to build the LH95 whilst additional sponsorship was sought, but not in time for the first race. This raised the prospect of the LH94 being modified to meet the new technical regulations and pass the tougher crash tests as a temporary solution to compete in the Brazilian and Argentine Grands Prix, but the team elected to miss these rounds of the season and focus on readying the LH95 for the next race at Imola. The modified LH94 would have undoubtedly been extremely overweight and uncompetitive. However, Larrousse was unable to raise the funds necessary for further competition in F1 and withdrew from the sport, meaning that the LH95 was never built and never raced.

Complete Formula One results
(key)

References
Footnotes

Books

External links
Larrousse LH94 at Chicane F1
Larrousse LH94 at the Formula One DataBase

1994 Formula One season cars
Larrousse Formula One cars